Elizabeth Denison may refer to:

Lisette Denison Forth (1786–1866), freed slave who funded the construction of Grosse Ile, Michigan's St. James Episcopal Church
Elizabeth Conyngham, Marchioness Conyngham (1769–1861), née Denison, last mistress of King George IV of the United Kingdom